Murray Island, also sometimes known as Bluff Island, is an island 6 mile long lying at the south-west side of Hughes Bay, off the west coast of Graham Land, Antarctica. The feature has been known to sealers operating in the area since the 1820s, although it was shown on charts as part of the mainland. In 1922 the whale catcher Graham passed through the channel separating it from the mainland, proving its insularity. It was named in association with Cape Murray, the seaward extremity of the island.

Important Bird Area
A 98 ha ice-free site on the western side of a small peninsula on the northern coast of the island was designated the Bluff Island Important Bird Area (IBA) by BirdLife International because, in 1989, it supported a breeding colony of about 180 pairs of Antarctic shags.

See also 
 List of Antarctic and subantarctic islands

Map
 British Antarctic Territory.  Scale 1:200000 topographic map. DOS 610 Series, Sheet W 64 60.  Directorate of Overseas Surveys, Tolworth, UK, 1978.

References

 SCAR Composite Gazetteer of Antarctica.

Islands of Graham Land
Danco Coast
Important Bird Areas of Antarctica
Seabird colonies